Allender is a surname. Notable people with the surname include:

Bruce M. Allender, a phycologist with the standard author abbreviation "Allender"
Dale Allender (born 1966), American educator
Eric Allender (born 1956), American computer scientist
Henry Allender (1872–1939), Australian rules footballer
Nina E. Allender (1873–1957), American artist and activist
Paul Allender (born 1970), English guitarist
Stephen Allender (born 1960), Australian rules footballer